Peter Colley Tavern and Barn is a historic home that also served as an inn and tavern located at Redstone Township, Fayette County, Pennsylvania.  It was built about 1796, and is a -story, 3-bay, stone building with a -story sandstone rear addition.  Also on the property is a contributing bank barn, built in 1848.  It served as a stop for 19th-century travelers on the National Road.

It was added to the National Register of Historic Places in 1973.

References

Houses on the National Register of Historic Places in Pennsylvania
Houses completed in 1796
Gothic Revival architecture in Pennsylvania
Houses in Fayette County, Pennsylvania
National Register of Historic Places in Fayette County, Pennsylvania
1796 establishments in Pennsylvania